C. E. Eriksson was a Swedish chairman of the Swedish Association football club Malmö FF, a post he held between 1934 and 1936.

References

Swedish sports executives and administrators
Malmö FF chairmen